This is a list of settlements in West Midlands by population based on the results of the 2011 census. The next United Kingdom census will take place in 2021. In 2011, there were 29 built-up area subdivisions with 5,000 or more inhabitants in the West Midlands, shown in the table below.

Administrative boundaries 

Table taken from the West Midlands County - Geography subsection:

Population ranking 
Table has been taken from the West Midlands Conurbation article and missing county areas added (#2 & 28)

See also 
West Midlands (county)
West Midlands conurbation

References

External links 
 ONS Census website

Settlements
West Midlands
West Midlands (county)